Okuike (奥池)（おくいけ） is a small lake, with adjoining reservoir lake "Okuyama Chosuichi" and surrounding high-class residential area located in Ashiya, Hyogo Prefecture in Japan. It is close to the major cities of Kobe and Osaka and is part of the Kansai region of Japan.  Okuike is located on a height of about 500–600 meters above sea level on the Southern aspect, and towards the Eastern part of Mount Rokkō (六甲山, Rokkō-san). The "village" of Okuike has around 730 properties and is often referred to as the "Beverly Hills of Japan", Okuike has an excellent natural landscape in residential areas due to regulations such as Japan's only "Mansion Ordinance" and the Natural Parks Act and the fact that building can only be constructed on existing plots of land and no subdivision can occur. The altitude of Okuike means there are far reaching views, sometimes of 100 km or more, across Osaka Bay towards Nara prefecture, Wakayama prefecture, Awajishima, Shikoku, Kansai International Airport, Osaka & Kobe, Akashi Kaikyō Bridge (明石海峡大橋, Akashi Kaikyō Ōhashi) and the Seto Inland Sea National Park. Access is by the toll road (Royu Parkway / Royu Driveway).

History 

Okuike Lake was completed in the Edo era (around 1841) after more than 20 years of difficult excavation work by Sarumaru Matazaemon Yasutoki, the Ashiya village chief at that time, with a wish to save the villagers who had been suffering from water shortage. Okuyama Reservoir was completed beside Okuike Lake in 1972. Both are still utilized as a water source by Ashiya City.

In the 1960s the present Royu Parkway or (Royu Driveway) road was constructed and development of Okuike started. At first the buildings in Okuike were all company owned retreats, but in the early to mid 1970's the first private residential houses were built. After this more private houses were constructed and Okuike started to transform for a corporate retreat area, to a residential area. With a regular bus service and close proximity to Ashiya City, it is a very convenient place to live for many people. Now Okuike is mostly private residential property.

Geography 

Divided into two small districts of Okuike cho and Okuike Minami cho, Okuike sits at approximately 34° North and 135° East, at an altitude of between 500 and 600 meters on the Southern Aspect towards the Eastern end of Mount Rokko In Hyogo Prefecture, Honshu Island in Japan. The Rokko Mountains are a very steep range (Rokko-zan peak 931 meters) located largely within the city limits of Kobe, but also covers parts of neighboring cities and towns such as Ashiya City. The range is largely constructed of the Late Cretaceous Rokko Granite. Various streams converge feed into the main Okuike lake which in turn serves as a feeder for the Ashiyagawa (Ashiya River) which flows down the mountain and through Ashiya city and into Osaka Bay. This location generally has a humid subtropical climate, but the climatic classification can be deceiving as it can be regularly below freezing in the winter with snow. The temperature is generally 5 or 6 degrees less than Ashiya city below, which make the area very comfortable in high summer when temperatures at sea level can get between 35 and 40 degrees C.

Flora and fauna 

Okuike is famed for the abundance of brightly coloured Hydrangea macrophylla or bigleaf Hydrangea, also referred to as French hydrangea, lacecap hydrangea, mophead hydrangea, penny mac and hortensia. 
The area is heavily forested with many tall Mountain Pines (kuromatsu) cover the forest area.
Inushishi (wild Japanese boar) are frequent in the forest and sometimes around Okuike.
Itatsi (イタチ) Japanese weasel are seen from time to time.
Aodaishō Japanese Rat Snake and Mamushi Japanese Pit Viper are sometimes seen.
Okuike Lake is abundant with Koi
Japanese bush warbler, known in Japanese as Uguisu (鶯) are common in Okuike and often heard in abundance from mid-March each year.
Kitsune Japanese Red Foxes are sometimes seen.

Access 

By Bus from Ashiya Hanshin, Ashiya JR and Ashiyagawa Stations; Hankyu Bus 80 toward Arima Onsen or 81 toward Ashiya Highland.
By Car from Ashiya along the Royu parkway toll road.
トップページ | 芦屋と有馬を快適につなぐ 芦有ドライブウェイ

Attractions 

 Okuike BBQ and Family Park
 Highland Park
 Emba Museum of Modern Art in China
 Okuike Tennis Club
 Okuike International Club
 Koshino Gallery
 Giichi Gallery
 Gimel Jewelers
 Okuike Lodge
 East Rokko Observatory/Route Cafe
 Ashiya Country Club
 Ashiyagawa Muragen

Activities 

 Trail Running
 Mountain Biking
 Climbing, hiking and trekking
 Tennis
 BBQ
 Lake walking.

Residents of Okuike 

Most residents of Okuike are affluent high net worth individuals and the small population is made up of business owners, entrepreneurs and CEO's/Chairmen of major international corporations. Also many successful artists live in Okuike, as well as fashion and jewelry designers. In fact Okuike is sometimes regarded as the creative hub of Ashiya city as you can also find houses of Nobel Prize winners, Olympians, novelists, futurists, elitists, and other people coming from non-industrial fields in the calm Ashiya-Okuike neighborhood. The average residential land plot size is around 600 square meters, which is large for Japan.

Resident nationalities 

There is a sizeable foreign resident population in Okuike almost all of which are highly professional persons, Scottish, English, Swiss, German, Norwegian, Australian, French, South African, Indian, Venezuelan, Peruvian, American, Canadian, Brazilian, Taiwanese, Israeli, etc. Many of these people, as well as local Japanese have come together to form the Okuike International Club.

Notable houses 

Koshino House - designed by Tadao Ando
Lantern House (formerly Glass House) - designed by Yamazaki Yasutaka
Okuike house - Mitsuru Nomura
"Moss Garden House" - designed by Tadao Ando
Lifted House - Sekiya Masato of Planet Creations
Blue House - NRM Architects
Small House in the Pine Trees - Yamazaki Yasutaka
Okuike Villa/Mountain House - Sachiko Fukiage
Villa of Okuike - Atsushi Shikaki
Okuike K - Sinato Inc.
Villa Okuike -
House in Okuike - Tomohiro Hata
Okuike Summer House - Maneira Architects
House in Okuike Minamicho - GodaiDCM
White Okuike House - Masaaki Hisatake
E-House - BASARA
Atlier Okuike - Kobayashi Tsune Architects

Surroundings 
JR Ashiya Station (13 minutes by car)
Rokrokuso Town (13 minutes' drive)
Arima Onsen (17 minutes' drive)
Rokko Garden Terrace (20 minutes by car)

References 

Lakes of Japan
Hyōgo Prefecture